Eager to Live is a 1953 Italian drama film directed by Claudio Gora. In 2008 the film was selected to enter the list of the 100 Italian films to be saved.

Plot 
Massimo lives in luxury, but in reality he is overwhelmed by debts and is tight in the shady business of the racing hall that he manages. To support his illusory rich life, he is forced to turn to usurers. He spends his days with a group of other snobbish and idle young people. Her partner Elena loves her, but he has no qualms about betraying her. His friend Daniele is released from prison, where he ended up despite being innocent, and discovers that Massimo, in order to pocket a derisory sum, had bribed the lawyer who defended Daniele and plotted so that his friend was sentenced. Elena is pregnant and a scam, discovered in her racing room, creates new problems for Massimo.

To silence Daniele, Massimo arranges a meeting with Lucia, her ex-girlfriend, but the girl no longer wants to know about that old love. To get out of Elena's pressures, Massimo convinces a young friend, Sandro, to take responsibility for Elena's pregnancy and to ask his parents for help. In this way he obtains that the girl is entrusted to an unscrupulous doctor who agrees to have her aborted. When Sandro discovers that he has been used and rebels, a fight breaks out and he dies hit by Massimo. To give the impression of a suicide, Massimo throws the body out of the window, at this point Lucia, even though she is in love with him, denounces him and has him arrested. Meanwhile, Elena escapes the clutches of the doctor and decides to continue the pregnancy, while Daniele is not resigned to her, he confesses to Lucia that he still loves her and that he will know how to wait for her.

Cast
Massimo Serato as Massimo
Marina Berti as Lucia
Anna Maria Ferrero as Elena
Marcello Mastroianni as Daniele
Sandro Milani as Sandro
Nyta Dover as Simona
Rubi D'Alma as La contessa madre
Vittorio Caprioli as Pierra
Paola Mori as Lisey
Carlo Mazzarella as Carletto

References

External links

1953 films
1953 drama films
1950s Italian-language films
Italian black-and-white films
Films directed by Claudio Gora
Films with screenplays by Suso Cecchi d'Amico
Italian drama films
1950s Italian films